Qād̨ub -  and also known as Kathub, Qadhub, or Qadib - is a town on the island of Socotra. It is located in the Hidaybu District close to Socotra Airport. With a population of 929 it is the third largest town of Socotra.

References

Populated places in Socotra
Socotra Governorate